Stasys Razma (18 July 1898 – 30 July 1960) was a Lithuanian footballer who competed in the 1924 Summer Olympics.

Razma was in the side that played in Lithuania's first ever international in 1923 against Estonia, which they lost 5–0, the following year he was called to play in his national side's first ever Olympic match which was in Paris, France, but the inexperienced side lost 9–0 to Switzerland so did not advance any further in the competition. Razma went on to play three more international matches including a 2–1 victory against Estonia, the country's first ever international win.

References

External links
 

1898 births
1960 deaths
Sportspeople from Kaunas
Lithuanian footballers
Association football defenders
Lithuania international footballers
Footballers at the 1924 Summer Olympics
Olympic footballers of Lithuania